Oktyabrsky is an urban locality (a work settlement) in Lyuberetsky District of Moscow Oblast, Russia, located  southeast of Moscow and  south of Lyubertsy. Population: 

It has been known since the 18th century, when it was called the village of Balyatino. It was renamed in 1917.

A large textile factory known as Shorigin's factory (renamed Fabrika Oktyabrskoy Revolyutsii in 1917). Known since Peter the Great as the backswords manufacturer, but later production was converted to textile. In 1912, factory invested into the new production lines shipped from United Kingdom and soon became an important one in the region. In time of the second world war the factory produced the camouflage tents for the front line. The factory played unique and important role in the settlement's life throughout the centuries and it was mirrored on the modern coat of arms. Nowadays is known as Textile-Profi trade complex.

There is a history museum.

The Local Government Board of Oktyabrsky is headed by Yury Baydukov since 2000. He was re-elected in 2005.

See also
Vyacheslav Danilin

References

M. P. Izmestyev, G. A. Grebennikov, "The Spring of Memory. Luberetsky Museum of Regional Studies" // RamTip, Ramenskoye, 2006

External links

Unofficial website of Oktyabrsky

Urban-type settlements in Moscow Oblast